The Olympic Park Speedway is a motorcycle speedway stadium located on the bank of the Murray River, at the Mildura Motorcycle Club, Olympic Park Mildura, Mildura, Victoria, Australia. The stadium hosts one of the rounds of the Australian National Championship and the Victorian Solo Championship. The speedway track has a circumference of 302 metres.

The 2023 edition of the Australian Championships was cancelled due to the surrounding area being flooded when the Murray River broke its banks.

References

Sport in Mildura
Sport in Victoria (Australia)
Buildings and structures in Victoria (Australia)
Sports venues in Victoria (Australia)
Mildura